Xiaocheng zhi chun is the Chinese title of two films:
Spring in a Small Town (dir. Fei Mu, 1948)
Springtime in a Small Town (dir. Tian Zhuangzhuang, 2002)